Michael or Mike Strachan may refer to:

Mike Strachan (running back) (born 1953), former American football player
Michael Strachan (wide receiver) (born 1997), American football player
Michael Strachan (businessman) (1919–2000), Scottish company director and author

See also
Michael Strahan (born 1971), American television personality, journalist, and former football player
Michaela Strachan (born 1966), English television presenter and singer